Cris Derksen is a two-spirit Juno Award–nominated Cree cellist from Northern Alberta, Canada. Derksen is known for her unique musical sound which blends classical music with traditional Indigenous music.  Her music is often described as "electronic cello" or classical traditional fusion.

Life and education
Derksen is from North Tallcree reserve in Northern Alberta, Canada, and has both Cree and Mennonite heritage. She attended a performing Victoria School for the Performing Arts in Edmonton, Canada and was trained in classical music from an early age. She received a Bachelor of Music in Cello Performance at the University of British Columbia.  During her time at UBC she held the position of Principal Cellist with the UBC Symphony Orchestra.

Career 
In 2009 Derksen was the curator in residence at the Vancouver East Cultural Centre.  She has traveled and performed internationally in numerous countries including: Germany, France, Spain, Norway, Czech Republic, Mexico, Sweden, and the United States.  She has performed with the Beat Nation Live Collective, Kanye West, Kinnie Starr, Tanya Tagaq, Rae Spoon, and traditional pow wow groups.

In 2015 Derksen's Orchestral Powwow Project album was produced in partnership with the independent record label Tribal Spirit Powwow. During the making of this album Derksen utilized Tribal Spirit's library of powwow music as a resource and incorporated some of the traditional music found in this library in her project. In the same year, Derkson was mentored by Canadian musician Buffy Sainte-Marie as part of an Ontario Arts Council grant.

In 2017, Derksen performed at the Annual Public Meeting of the Canada Council of the Arts with the Cris Derksen Trio which includes drummer Jesse Baird and dancer Nimkii Osawamick.

In 2019, the Art Gallery of Ontario commissioned Derksen to create a new choral work inspired by the Early Rubens exhibition at the Art Gallery of Ontario. Also in 2019, Derkson composed Maada’ookii Songlines, a choral work featuring 200 singers as part of the Luminato Festival. Alongside, Chistine Tootoo and Jamie Griffiths, Derksen was part of a 2019 performance piece called Ikummagialiit, that was commissioned by the National Gallery of Canada  as part of the Àbadakone exhibition on Indigenous art.

In 2020, Derksen performed as part of CBC Gem's Queer Pride Inside special.

Musical releases
 The Cusp (2010)
 The Collapse (May 2013)
 Orchestral Powwow Project (2015)

Composer credits
 People of a Feather (feature film, 2011)
 TransMigration (Kahawi Dance, 2012)
 8th Fire soundtrack (CBC Television mini-series, 2012)
 Sound design for two plays for Native Earth Theatre's Weesageechak Festival (2014)
Treading Water, documentary, Wookey Films (2014)
 The Pass System (film) (2015)
Taken, TV series Introduction (2016)
Re-Quickening, Kaha:wi Dance Company (2016) 
Rise, Vice Series (2016)
"Kiinalik: These Sharp Tools" with Evalyn Parry (2017)
Kamloopa (2019)
Maada’ookii Songlines (2019)
Rebellion, commissioned by Thunder Bay Symphony Orchestra.

Awards

 With Evalyn Parry for "Kiinalik: These Sharp Tools", Outstanding Sound Design/Composition, General Theatre Division, Dora Mavour Moore award (2018)
Indigenous Music Awards Nominee (2017)
Juno Award Nominee, Instrumental Album of the Year (2016)
First Tracks funding (2012)
Aboriginal Peoples Choice Music Award nominee for best new artist and best instrumental album (2011)
Canadian Aboriginal Music Award for Instrumental Album of the Year (2011)
Western Canadian Music Award Nominee (2011)
Aboriginal Peoples Television Network rising star (2009)

See also
Aboriginal Canadian personalities

References

Year of birth missing (living people)
Living people
Two-spirit people
First Nations musicians
University of British Columbia alumni
Canadian cellists
Canadian LGBT musicians
Cree people
LGBT First Nations people
Dora Mavor Moore Award winners
21st-century Canadian LGBT people
Musicians from Alberta